East Ipswich railway station is located on the Main line in Queensland, Australia. It serves the suburb of East Ipswich in City of Ipswich. It opened in 1879 as Limestone, being renamed East Ipswich in 1892.

Services
East Ipswich is served by trains operating to and from Ipswich and Rosewood. Most city-bound services run to Caboolture and Nambour, with some morning peak trains terminating at Bowen Hills. Some afternoon inbound services on weekdays run to Kippa-Ring. East Ipswich is two minutes from Ipswich and 56 minutes on an all-stops train from Central.

Services by platform

*Note: One weekday morning service (4:56am from Central) and selected afternoon peak services continue through to Rosewood.  At all other times, a change of train is required at Ipswich.

References

External links

East Ipswich station Queensland Rail
East Ipswich station Queensland's Railways on the Internet

Railway stations in Australia opened in 1879
East Ipswich, Queensland
Railway stations in Ipswich City
Main Line railway, Queensland